Conus honkerorum is a species of sea snail, a marine gastropod mollusc in the family Conidae, the cone snails, cone shells or cones.

These snails are predatory and venomous. They are capable of "stinging" humans.

Description
The size of the shell attains 20 mm.

Distribution
This marine species occurs from the southern islands of the Bimini chain to the Bahamas.

References

  Puillandre N., Duda T.F., Meyer C., Olivera B.M. & Bouchet P. (2015). One, four or 100 genera? A new classification of the cone snails. Journal of Molluscan Studies. 81: 1-23

External links
 To World Register of Marine Species
 
 Xenophora taxonomy 3 suppl. 2014-7

honkerorum
Gastropods described in 2014